The Chess World Cup 2013 was a 128-player single-elimination chess tournament, played between 11 August and 2 September 2013, in the hotel Scandic Tromsø in Tromsø, Norway. It was won by Vladimir Kramnik, who defeated Dmitry Andreikin 2½–1½ in the final match. The finalists qualified for the 2014 Candidates Tournament.

The winner of the Chess World Cup 2011, Peter Svidler, was defeated by Dmitry Andreikin in the quarter-finals.

Format
Matches consisted of two games (except for the final, which consisted of four). Players had 90 minutes for the first 40 moves followed by 30 minutes for the rest of the game with an addition of 30 seconds per move from the start of the game. If a match was tied after the regular games, tie breaks were played on the next day. The format for the tie breaks was as follows:
 Two rapid games (25 minutes plus 10 seconds increment) were to be played.
 If the score was tied after two rapid games, two rapid games (10 minutes plus 10 seconds increment) were to be played.
 If the score was tied after four rapid games, the opponents were to play two blitz games (five minutes plus three seconds increment).
 If the score was tied after a pair of blitz games, an armageddon game (in which a draw counts as a win for Black) was played. White would have five minutes and Black would have four minutes, and both players would have a three seconds per move increment beginning with move 61.

Prize money

Participants
The participating players were seeded by their July 2013 FIDE ratings:

, 2813 (R)
, 2796 (R)
, 2784 (R)
, 2780 (WC)
, 2776 (R)
, 2775 (R)
, 2773 (R)
, 2763 (R)
, 2761 (R)
, 2757 (R)
, 2756 (WC)
, 2752 (R)
, 2746 (WC)
, 2740 (R)
, 2737 (R)
, 2736 (R)
, 2734 (E12)
, 2734 (R)
, 2733 (WC)
, 2733 (R)
, 2727 (E12)
, 2720 (E13)
, 2719 (PN)
, 2717 (R)
, 2715 (PN)
, 2714 (E12)
, 2714 (E13)
, 2713 (E12)
, 2712 (AS13)
, 2709 (E13)
, 2709 (E12)
, 2709 (R)
, 2708 (Z3.3)
, 2708 (E12)
, 2708 (E12)
, 2706 (E12)
, 2702 (E13)
, 2701 (R)
, 2699 (E13)
, 2699 (E13)
, 2696 (R)
, 2696 (PN)
, 2693 (E12)
, 2691 (E12)
, 2689 (Z2.3)
, 2688 (E12)
, 2686 (AS13)
, 2680 (E13)
, 2680 (E12)
, 2679 (AM12)
, 2678 (E12)
, 2672 (E12)
, 2668 (E12)
, 2667 (E13)
, 2667 (Z2.1)
, 2665 (E12)
, 2664 (E13)
, 2662 (E13)
, 2660 (E13)
, 2660 (AS13)
, 2659 (E13)
, 2658 (E12)
, 2657 (AS12)
, 2656 (E13)
, 2651 (E13)
, 2651 (E13)
, 2651 (E12)
, 2650 (J11)
, 2650 (E13)
, 2650 (AF)
, 2643 (Z3.4)
, 2643 (E12)
, 2643 (E12)
, 2642 (Z2.3)
, 2638 (E13)
, 2636 (E12)
, 2635 (E13)
, 2634 (AS12)
, 2632 (E13)
, 2632 (Z2.4)
, 2632 (E13)
, 2631 (E13)
, 2628 (Z2.1)
, 2628 (E12)
, 2625 (Z3.3)
, 2620 (E13)
, 2612 (AM13)
, 2600 (PN)
, 2599 (ON)
, 2596 (AF)
, 2595 (Z2.4)
, 2593 (E13)
, 2592 (AM13)
, 2586 (Z2.5)
, 2584 (Z2.1)
, 2583 (J12)
, 2583 (Z2.1)
, 2581 (AM12)
, 2577 (AM12)
, 2572 (AS12)
, 2569 (AS13)
, 2567 (AS13)
, 2567 (ON)
, 2562 (Z2.5)
, 2557 (PN)
, 2553 (AM12)
, 2549 (E12)
, 2548 (Z3.1)
, 2543 (AM13)
, 2536, IM (PN)
, 2531 (AS12)
, 2530 (Z2.1)
, 2530 (Z2.2)
, 2520 (ON)
, 2509, IM (Z3.5)
, 2500 (WWC)
, 2500, IM (AS12)
, 2492, IM (ON)
, 2490 (AF)
, 2487, IM (Z4.2)
, 2483, IM (Z3.5)
, 2470 (Z3.2)
, 2434, WGM (AM13)
, 2371, untitled (Z4.1)
, 2341, FM (Z3.6)
, 2341, FM (Z4.3)
, 2332, IM (Z3.7)
, 2305, untitled (Z3.4)

All players are grandmasters unless indicated otherwise.

Qualification paths

WC: Semi-finalists of the Chess World Cup 2011
WWC: Women's World Champion
J11 and J12: World Junior Champions 2011 and 2012
R: Rating (average of all published ratings from March 2012 to January 2013 is used)
E12 and E13: European Individual Championships 2012 and 2013
AM12 and AM13: American Continental Championship 2012 and 2013

AS12 and AS13: Asian Chess Championship 2012 and 2013
AF: African Chess Championship 2013
Z2.1, Z2.2, Z2.3, Z2.4, Z2.5, Z3.1, Z3.2, Z3.3, Z3.4, Z3.5, Z3.6, Z3.7, Z4.1, Z4.2, Z4.3: Zonal tournaments
PN: FIDE president nominee
ON: Organizer nominee

Prominent non-participants
Magnus Carlsen, Viswanathan Anand, and Veselin Topalov qualified for the event, but they declined to participate. The only other player from the world's top 30 who did not participate is Ding Liren. Levon Aronian (who declined to play in 2009 and 2011) and Vladimir Kramnik (who had never played in a Chess World Cup) chose to participate because FIDE made participation in either the Chess World Cup or the FIDE Grand Prix series mandatory for qualification to the 2014 Candidates Tournament through rating.

Post-tournament opinions
In particular, Alexander Grischuk was decidedly negative about the organization, as was noted coach Vladimir Chuchelov.

Calendar

Results, rounds 1–4

Section 1

Section 2

Section 3

Section 4

Section 5

Section 6

Section 7

Section 8

Results, rounds 5–7

Final, 30 August – 2 September

References

External links
 
 Chess World Cup 2013 games
 Chess World Cup 2013 at Chessdom

2013
World Cup
World Cup
Sport in Tromsø
2013 in Norwegian sport
International sports competitions hosted by Norway